ppc64 is an identifier commonly used within the Linux, GNU Compiler Collection (GCC) and LLVM open-source software communities to refer to the target architecture for applications optimized for 64-bit big-endian PowerPC and Power ISA processors.

ppc64le is a pure little-endian mode that has been introduced with the POWER8 as the prime target for technologies provided by the OpenPOWER Foundation, aiming at enabling porting of the x86 Linux-based software with minimal effort.

Details
These two identifiers are frequently used when compiling source code to identify the target architecture.

64-bit Power and PowerPC processors are the following:
 PowerPC 620
 RS64 – Apache, RS64-II Northstar, RS64-III Pulsar/IStar, and RS64-IV SStar
 POWER3 and POWER3-II
 POWER4 and POWER4+
 PowerPC 970, 970FX, 970MP and 970GX
 POWER5 and POWER5+
 PPE in Cell BE, PowerXCell 8i and Xenon.
 PWRficient
 POWER6 and POWER6+
 POWER7 and POWER7+
 A2, A2I (used in the Blue Gene/Q) and A2O
 PowerPC e5500 core based
 PowerPC e6500 core based
 POWER8 – P8-6c Murano, P8-12c Turismo and Venice, P8E (with NVLink) and CP1
 POWER9 – P9C Cumulus, P9N Nimbus and P9 AIO Axone
 Power10
 Microwatt, open source soft core
 Chiselwatt, open source soft core

Defunct 64-bit PowerPC processors are the Motorola G5 and PowerPC e700.

References

External links 
 
 Linux Standard Base Specification for the PPC64 Architecture 2.1, 2003

Computer-related introductions in 1997
64-bit computers
PowerPC microprocessors
Instruction set architectures
Power microprocessors
IBM microprocessors